Deepraj Rana (also Deepraz Rana or Deep Raj Rana) is an Indian and Nepali film and television actor.

Early life
He was born and brought up in Allahabad. Now he lives in Mumbai. He is married to TV actress Natasha Rana known for the role of Chhoti Maa in the television series Sapna Babul Ka...Bidaai.

Career
He has been working for over two decades and his major roles include those in the serial Reporter and in the film Mangal Pandey: The Rising.

Filmography

Television

Films

References

Hindustan Times 
Times of India
Deepraj Rana Official Website

External links
 

Indian male film actors
Indian male television actors
Indian male stage actors
Living people
Year of birth missing (living people)